On 21 November 2020, 69 inmates escaped from a prison in Baabda, Lebanon.

It was reported that the prisoners smashed their cell doors and attacked prison guards. Fifteen escapees were re-arrested and another four turned themselves in after. Five others were killed and one was injured in a car crash after stealing the car on the run. 44 escapees were not caught.

References

2020 in Lebanon
2020 prison escape
November 2020 crimes in Asia
Prison escapes
2020 crimes in Lebanon